City Water, Light & Power (CWLP) is the largest municipally owned utility in the U.S. state of Illinois.  The utility provides the city of Springfield, Illinois with electric power from one coal-fired boiler.  The boilers operate with water from the utility's wholly owned Lake Springfield, which also provides drinking water for the city.  The utility also owns much of the riparian property around Lake Springfield, some of which is preserved for local recreation and some of which is leased to local nonprofits, such as Lincoln Memorial Gardens.

The utility has long-term plans, with no fixed completion date set, to construct a second reservoir, Hunter Lake.  In addition, CWLP is moving away from coal into other forms of electrical sourcing and production.  On February 4, 2020, the city of Springfield gave final approval to a plan to shut down two of CWLP's four coal boilers by December 2020.

Notes

Springfield, Illinois
Municipal electric utilities of the United States
Public utilities of the United States
Companies based in Sangamon County, Illinois
Public utilities established in 1911
1911 establishments in Illinois